Albert Legault (7 June 1938 – 18 September 2022) was a Canadian academic and researcher. He notably performed research on strategic studies and specialized in peacekeeping. He published several books on nuclear deterrence and disarmament. He worked as a professor for the Université du Québec à Montréal and the Université Laval. He held a PhD from the Graduate Institute of International Studies.

Awards
Member of the Royal Society of Canada (1977)
 (1994)
Innis-Gérin Medal (1995)
Member of the Order of Canada (2000)

References

1938 births
2022 deaths
French Quebecers
20th-century Canadian scientists
21st-century Canadian scientists
Academic staff of Université Laval
Academic staff of the Université du Québec à Montréal
Members of the Order of Canada
Graduate Institute of International and Development Studies alumni